Primal Doubt is a 2007 television drama film directed by Yelena Lanskaya, starring Janine Turner and Costas Mandylor.

Plot summary

Former romance author Jean Harper (Turner), who is lonely, signs onto a matchmaking website. Jean agrees to meet her correspondent, but she finds him dead at his home.

Cast
 Janine Turner as Jean Harper
 Costas Mandylor as Chase Harper
 Maeve Quinlan as Holly
 William Allen Young as Detective Ben Riggs
 Freda Foh Shen as Detective Maggie Conrad
 Jamie Rose as Dr. Marianne Thorne
 Brittany Ishibashi as Carla
 Amanda Fuller as Claire Harper
 Nick Kiriazis as Travis Freeman
 Rae Ritke as Amanda Freeman
 Emily Warfield as Holly's Assistant
 Monica McSwain as Chase's Assistant

References

External links 
 
 

2007 films
2000s English-language films
American mystery films
American thriller drama films
2000s psychological thriller films
2000s mystery films
2007 thriller drama films
American psychological thriller films
2007 drama films
2008 drama films
2008 films
2000s American films